John Lawrence Antonelli (July 15, 1915 – April 18, 1990) was an American third baseman in Major League Baseball in 1944–45 and a longtime coach and manager at the minor league level.

A manager at age 19
Antonelli was one of the youngest and least-experienced managers in minor league baseball annals. In , he signed his first professional contract with his hometown Memphis Chicks of the Southern Association, played in three games, batted 11 times, and garnered two hits for a .182 batting average. He was then assigned, at age 19, to be the playing manager of the Lexington Giants of the Class D KITTY League, where he batted .326 and led the Giants to a 42–44 won/loss mark. Antonelli remained a playing skipper in the KITTY League through , where in his final season he managed the Union City Greyhounds, a farm club of the St. Louis Cardinals, to a first-place finish.

After 1937, he suspended his managing career and was purely a second baseman and third baseman with the Cardinals' Houston Buffaloes and Columbus Red Birds farm clubs for almost seven full seasons. Antonelli batted over .300 only once, but led his leagues in fielding percentage as both a second- and third baseman.

MLB service with Cardinals and Phillies
On September 16, 1944, at age 29, Antonelli was recalled by the Cardinals and played his first National League game. He appeared in eight games for the  Cardinals and two more in the beginning of  before St. Louis swapped him to the Philadelphia Phillies on May 8. Antonelli played 125 games for the 1945 Phils and batted .256. With the end of the World War II manpower shortage, Antonelli's major league playing career ended. In 135 games and 528 at bats, he batted .252 with one home run and 29 runs batted in.

Manager in Mets' organization
Antonelli's minor league playing career ended in 1950 as a playing manager, when he led the Hot Springs Bathers to the championship of the Class C Cotton States League. He briefly scouted for the Chicago White Sox in the years following, but largely spent the period of 1951–67 out of professional baseball. In , the New York Mets established a Double-A Texas League farm team, the Memphis Blues, in Antonelli's hometown and Antonelli returned to uniform as a coach. In , Antonelli succeeded Pete Pavlick as Memphis manager' and held the post until Roy McMillan arrived from Class-A Visalia to take over the helm. His career record as a minor league manager was 745–688 (.520).

Antonelli then served as a roving minor league infield instructor in the Mets' system, through 1985. He died in 1990 in Memphis at the age of 74 and is buried at Calvary Cemetery.

See also
Van Lingle Mungo (song)

External links

References 

1915 births
1990 deaths
Baltimore Orioles (IL) players
Baseball players from Memphis, Tennessee
Buffalo Bisons (minor league) players
Chicago White Sox scouts
Columbus Red Birds players
Hot Springs Bathers players
Houston Buffaloes players
Lexington Giants (KITTY League) players
Major League Baseball third basemen
Memphis Chickasaws players
Norfolk Tides managers
Philadelphia Phillies players
St. Louis Cardinals players
Union City Greyhounds players